Billy Hughes (November 28, 1948 – December 20, 2005) (Billy Eugene Hughes, Jr.) was an American actor best known for various television and film roles he played during the 1960s.  His Hollywood lineage included both his father (Bill Hughes) and uncle (Whitey Hughes), who were both stuntmen and film producers. While in Alma, Arkansas, in 2005, he apparently died in his sleep.

Television Roles
Between 1960 and 1964 Hughes appeared in over a dozen television programs, beginning with Robert Taylor's Detectives, where he played the role of Bobby Marx in the episode "The Little Witness".  Other TV work included The Shirley Temple Show, Leave It to Beaver, Gunsmoke, The Twilight Zone, Dr. Kildare, Wagon Train, and Lassie.

Hughes appeared in three different episodes of Gunsmoke between 1961 and '62, playing the roles of Joey Glover (in "Millie"), Timmy (in "Us Haggens"), which introduced Ken Curtis in the role of Festus, and Tommy.  From 1961 to 1964 he also had three appearances on Wagon Train (playing Adam Bancroft as a Boy, Mark Basham, and Matt).  Two of his three appearances on Lassie were in the role of Billy Joe (in the 1961 episodes "Cracker Jack" and "Yochim's Christmas"), while in 1964 he played Ricky Sutton in the episode "Climb the Mountain Slowly".

Hughes also appeared in three episodes of The Rifleman: "Long Gun From Tucson", "Day of Reckoning", and "Sidewinder". In "Sidewinder", he had a lead role playing 13-year-old Gridley Maule Jr., a young gunman seeking vengeance for his father's death. Filmed while he was still only thirteen years old, Hughes displayed remarkable talent at handling a Colt revolver. According to a close friend of Hughes, this was one of his favorite roles.

Television appearances

Filmography
Ole Rex (1961) - The runaway boy
Posse from Hell (1961) - Jackie Hutchins (uncredited role)
Stakeout! (1962) - Joey Dasco, Jr.
My Six Loves (1963) - Leo
Smoke in the Wind (1975) - Till Mondier (as Billy Hughes, Jr.)

Billy Hughes also had an uncredited stunt role in the 1969 film The Wild Bunch. He is sometimes mistakenly credited with a role in Gone with the West (1975) but this was likely a token appearance by his father Billy Hughes Sr.

References

Bibliography

External links

Billy Hughes Memorial on A Minor Consideration Website

American male child actors
American male film actors
1948 births
2005 deaths
20th-century American male actors